Istgah-e Attar (also Romanized as Īstgāh-e ‘Aţţār; also known as ‘Aţţār) is a village in Takht-e Jolgeh Rural District, in the Central District of Firuzeh County, Razavi Khorasan Province, Iran. In the 2006 census, its population was 25, in 6 families.

References 

Populated places in Firuzeh County